Talia Hibbert is a  British romance novelist. She writes contemporary and paranormal romance. Critics describe her as a writer of diverse narratives, with characters of varying race, ethnicity, body shape, sexual orientation, and life experience. She is best known for her 2019 novel Get a Life, Chloe Brown.

Career 
During her childhood, Hibbert dealt with negative comments about her dream to be a writer. She used an inheritance from her great-grandmother to finance the beginning of her writing career, and began self-publishing in 2017, She put out her first nine books within one year. Her first traditionally published book, Get a Life, Chloe Brown, was released in 2019 with Avon Romance, and is the first book of a  family romance trilogy.

Themes 
Many of Hibbert's characters fall under the hashtag #OwnVoices, meaning they are part of a marginalized group Hibbert identifies with. Many of her protagonists are black women. The main character in Get a Life, Chloe Brown lives with chronic pain. In her book A Girl Like Her, the main character, Ruth, is autistic. The third book in The Brown Sisters series, Act Your Age, Eve Brown, features two autistic leads.

Hibbert's stories include characters with a diverse range of body types. She has stated, "...it’s always been really, really important to me that I represent diverse body types in my romance to show that all different kinds of people can be attractive and all different kinds of people deserve happy endings."

In Hibbert's book Get a Life, Chloe Brown, she demonstrates the strain that chronic pain can place on both familial and romantic relationships. But, as a romance novel, Get a Life, Chloe Brown also shows how someone with chronic pain is deserving and capable of having a loving relationship. The book explores methods of reasserting a sense of control within a life that was once ruled by illness.

Hibbert's books reflect a change in the romance genre toward explicit consent during intimate scenes. In the author's LGBTQ romance Work For It, one of the protagonists deals with finding love even while living with depression.

Personal life 
For much of her life, Hibbert struggled with undiagnosed health issues, until she was diagnosed with fibromyalgia. Hibbert's multiple issues with doctors inspired the topic of medical discrimination in Get a Life, Chloe Brown.

Hibbert is autistic.

Bibliography

Awards

References

21st-century English novelists
21st-century English women writers
Black British women writers
Living people
People with fibromyalgia
Year of birth missing (living people)
English women novelists
English romantic fiction writers
Women romantic fiction writers
People on the autism spectrum